Almahue Airport ,  is an airport  southwest of Pichidegua, a town in the O'Higgins Region of Chile.

There are hills north and east of the airport.

See also

Transport in Chile
List of airports in Chile

References

External links
OpenStreetMap - Almahue
OurAirports - Almahue
FallingRain - Almahue Airport

Airports in O'Higgins Region